John or Johnny Jackson may refer to:

Entertainment

Art
 John Baptist Jackson (1701–1780), British artist
 John Jackson (painter) (1778–1831), British painter
 John Jackson (engraver) (1801–1848), English wood engraver
 John Richardson Jackson (1819–1877), English engraver
 John Adams Jackson (1825–1879), American sculptor
 J. B. Jackson (1909–1996), writer and sketch artist in landscape design
 John Reno Jackson (born 1995), Caymanian artist

Music
 John Enderby Jackson (1827–1903), English musician and composer
 John Jackson (blues musician) (1924–2002), American
 John Jackson (musician), guitarist for the Jayhawks
 Johnny Jackson (musician) (1955–2006), drummer with the Jackson 5
 John Jackson, legal name of rapper Fabolous

Other entertainment
 John Jackson (travel writer) (died 1807), British traveler and writer
 John G. Jackson (writer) (1907–1993), African-American cultural historian and writer
 J. J. Jackson (media personality) (1941–2004), American radio and television personality
 John M. Jackson (born 1950), American actor best known for playing the J.A.G. on JAG
 John E. Jackson (make-up artist), American make-up artist
 John Jackson (writer), English television writer

Politics

U.K.
 John Jackson (Pontefract MP) (died 1637), English politician; MP 1624–1629
 Sir John Jackson, 1st Baronet (1763–1820), British businessman, MP for Dover and a baronet
 John Jackson (engineer) (1851–1919), British engineer and politician, MP for Plymouth Devonport, 1910–1918
 John Arthur Jackson (1862–1937), British Conservative Party politician
 John Jackson (South East Derbyshire MP) (1919–1976), British Conservative politician
 John Edward Jackson (diplomat) (1925–2002), British diplomat

U.S.
 John G. Jackson (politician) (1777–1825), Virginia politician and federal judge
 John Jackson (mayor) (1809–1887), mayor of Tampa, Florida
 John Jay Jackson Jr. (1824–1907), Virginia and West Virginia politician and federal judge
 John Jackson (Richmond politician) (1848–1910), member of the Virginia House of Delegates
 John B. Jackson (1862–1920), U.S. diplomat, United States Ambassador to Serbia
 John Holmes Jackson (1871–1944), mayor of Burlington, Vermont
 John S. Jackson (Wisconsin politician) (1874–1960), Wisconsin farmer and politician

Other political figures
 John Rawleigh Jackson (1780–?), planter, slave-owner and politician in Jamaica
 John Alexander Jackson (1809–1885), Colonial Treasurer of South Australia
 John Alexander Jackson (Tasmanian politician) (1844–1889), Attorney-General of Tasmania, 1872 to 1873
 John Robert Jackson (1859–1925), rancher and politician in British Columbia, Canada

Religion
 John Jackson (minister) (1621–1693), English nonconformist
 John Jackson (military chaplain) (died 1717), Anglican priest and first chaplain to the garrison at St John's, Newfoundland
 John Jackson (controversialist) (1686–1763), English clergyman
 John Jackson (archdeacon of Clogher) (fl. 1762–1783)
 John Edward Jackson (antiquarian) (1805–1891), English cleric and archivist
 John Jackson (bishop) (1811–1885), bishop of Lincoln and of Bishop of London
 John Long Jackson (1884–1948), bishop of the Episcopal Diocese of Louisiana
 John Paul Jackson (1950–2015), American author, teacher, founder of Streams Ministries International

Science
 John Hughlings Jackson (1835–1911), neurologist, namesake of Jacksonian seizure
 John Price Jackson (1868–1948), American electrical engineer and academic
 J. Wilfrid Jackson (1880–1978), British geologist and paleontologist
 John Jackson (astronomer) (1887–1958), Scottish astronomer
 John Meadows Jackson (1907–1998), British mathematician and physicist
 John S. Jackson (1920–1991), Irish geologist
 John David Jackson (physicist) (1925–2016), Canadian–American physicist and author of a graduate textbook on electrodynamics
 John P. Jackson, American physicist and leading researcher on the Shroud of Turin

Sports

American football
 John Jackson (offensive tackle) (born 1965), former NFL offensive tackle
 John Jackson (wide receiver) (born 1967), former NFL player
 Johnnie Jackson (American football) (born 1967), cornerback

Association football
 John Jackson (football manager) (1861–1931), first manager of Brighton and Hove Albion
 John Jackson (footballer, born 1885) (1885–?), Scottish footballer (Clyde, Leeds City, Celtic, Dundee)
 John Jackson (footballer, born 1906) (1906–1965), Scottish football goalkeeper (Partick Thistle, Chelsea)
 John Jackson (footballer, born 1923) (1923–1992), English footballer for Stoke City
 John Jackson (footballer, born 1942) (1942–2022), English football goalkeeper for Crystal Palace

Baseball
 Bud Fowler (born John W. Jackson, 1858–1913), pioneer black baseball player and club organizer
 John Jackson (baseball) (1909–1956), Major League Baseball pitcher, 1933
 Big Train Jackson (John William Jackson Jr., born 1917), American baseball player

Boxing
 John Jackson (English boxer) (1769–1845), English boxer
 John David Jackson (boxer) (born 1963), former super welterweight boxer
 John Jackson (Virgin Islands boxer) (born 1989), Olympic boxer from the Virgin Islands

Cricket
 John Jackson (cricketer, born 1833) (1833–1901), English cricketer
 John Jackson (cricketer, born 1841) (1841–1906), English cricketer
 John Jackson (Worcestershire cricketer) (1880–1968), English cricketer
 John Jackson (cricketer, born 1898) (1898–1958), Chilean cricketer

Other sports
 John Jackson (jockey), British classic winning jockey
 John Jackson (sport shooter) (1885–1971), American Olympic sport shooter
 John Angelo Jackson (1921–2005), mountaineer
 John Jackson (athlete) (born 1941), British steeplechaser
 John Jackson (speedway rider) (born 1952), British speedway rider
 John Jackson (racing driver) (born 1964), professional racing driver
 J. D. Jackson (basketball) (born 1969), Canadian basketball coach and former player
 John James Jackson (born 1977), British bobsledder and Royal Marines commando
 John Jackson (field hockey) (born 1986), Irish field hockey player

Others
 John Mills Jackson (c. 1764–1836), Canadian author, merchant, and justice of the peace
 John K. Jackson (1828–1866), American lawyer and soldier
 John Andrew Jackson, American slave
 John Payne Jackson (1848–1915), Americo-Liberian journalist
 John Francis Jackson (1908–1942), Australian fighter ace of World War II
 John Jackson (trade unionist) (1919–1995), British trade union leader
 John Jackson (businessman) (born 1929), author and campaigner
 John Jackson (law professor) (1932–2015), American law professor at Georgetown University
 John L. Jackson Jr. (born 1971), professor and dean of the University of Pennsylvania School of Social Policy and Practice
 John Jackson (hacker) (born 1994 or 1995), security researcher

See also
 Jackson (name)